Track Aduowan is a 2010 Chinese historical comedy film and sequel to Hands Up!. It was directed and written by Feng Xiaoning, and produced by Han Sanping. The film stars Pan Changjiang, Guo Da, and Liu Wei. It based on the Second Sino-Japanese War. It was released in China on September 9, 2010 to commemorate the 65th anniversary of the victory of the Second Sino-Japanese War.

Cast
 Pan Changjiang as the Imperial Japanese Army officer.
 Guo Da as the cook Guo, an underground Communist in Aduowan.
 Liu Wei as "Me"/ Mother/ Grandmother, the narrator of the film.

Other
 Feng Weiduo as the granddaughter of cook Guo.
 Dai Feifei as Miss Zhao, a Chinese espionage.
 Hu Xiaoguang as the tycoon.
 Yin Guohua as the interpreter of Imperial Japanese Army.
 Bao De as the captain of Eighth Route Army.
 Zhang Xiaoning as an Imperial Japanese Army soldier.
 Stephen as the captain of the United States Navy submarine.

Release
It was shown at the 2010 Beijing Film Festival.

References

External links

 
 

2010s Mandarin-language films
2010s war comedy films
Chinese war comedy films
Second Sino-Japanese War films
Films directed by Feng Xiaoning